Ammakandakara is a village in Adoor Taluk Pallickal Panchayath in Pathanamthitta district, Kerala, India.

References 

Villages in Pathanamthitta district